Microsoft's Professional Developers Conference (PDC) was a series of conferences for software developers; the conference was held infrequently to coincide with beta releases of the Windows operating system, and showcased topics of interest to those developing hardware and software for the new version of Windows.

In 2011, PDC was merged with Microsoft's web development conference MIX to form the Build Conference.

Events 
 July 1992 - Moscone Center in San Francisco, California
 Known as Win32 Professional Developers Conference
 First demonstration of the Win32 API and first mention of "Chicago", which would eventually become Windows 95
 Estimated attendance of over 5,000 developers
 Windows NT 3.1 Preliminary Release for Developers (build 297) was sent to all conference attendees
 December 1993 - Anaheim Convention Center in Anaheim, California
 Windows "Chicago"
 Win32 and Object Linking and Embedding version 2
 Estimated attendance of over 8,000
 Cairo public demonstration, including the Object File System
 March 1996 - Moscone Center in San Francisco, California
 Microsoft demonstrated the power of new tools, renamed ActiveX
 The ActiveX demos were impressive despite occasional technical difficulties. Microsoft and other industry leaders presented VBScript, an implementation of OLE Scripting; ActiveX Controls, for embedding OLE Controls into HTML documents; ActiveX Conferencing, which enables sharing data as well as applications over TCP/IP; the Internet Control Pack, allowing developers to make their applications Internet aware; and numerous other ActiveX technologies.
 November, 1996 - Long Beach, California November 3–7, 1996
 September 1997 - San Diego Convention Center in San Diego, California
 First demonstrations of Windows NT 5.0, release of Beta 1 to developers
 Estimated attendance of 6,200
 October 11–15, 1998 - Colorado Convention Center, Denver, Colorado
 Windows NT 5.0, the release of Beta 2 to developers.
 Windows DNA technology announced, including COM+

2000-2009
 July 11–14, 2000 - Orange County Convention Center in Orlando, Florida
.NET Framework and Visual Studio .NET announced, initial beta release given to attendees
C# programming language announced and demonstrated
ASP+, the successor to Active Server Pages was announced; this was renamed ASP.NET later in the year
Announcement of the end of the Windows 9x line, culminating with a planned 2002 release of a new operating system, "Whistler"
Internet Explorer 5.5 was released
Estimated attendance of 6,000 developers
 October 22–26, 2001 - Los Angeles Convention Center in Los Angeles, California
Release candidates of the .NET Framework and Visual Studio .NET were announced during Bill Gates' keynote.
Windows XP was officially released.
Introduction of Tablet PC, including a software development kit.
.NET My Services (codenamed HailStorm) announced.
.NET Compact Framework introduced.
First discussions of Internet Information Services version 6.
Counting Crows performed at the PDC party at the Staples Center.
 October 27–30, 2003 - Los Angeles Convention Center in Los Angeles, California
Windows Longhorn revealed - Avalon, Aero, Indigo, WinFS
 September 13–16, 2005 - Los Angeles Convention Center in Los Angeles, California
Windows Vista build 5219 handed out to attendees
Internet Explorer 7 demoed
Office 12 demoed with ribbon bar
.NET 2.0
 October 27–30, 2008 - Los Angeles Convention Center in Los Angeles, California.
First demonstration of Windows 7 as well as Office 14 for the Web .
Introduction of Windows Azure, Microsoft's data center hosting platform.
Outlook to .NET 4.0, Visual Studio 2010 and a new .NET Application Server (codenamed "Dublin").
Release of Microsoft Surface SDK and first demonstration of SecondLight, a next generation Surface prototype.
 November 17–20, 2009 - Los Angeles Convention Center in Los Angeles, California
Vision of Three Screens and a Cloud
Emergence of Windows Azure with billed, commercial service to begin in February 2010.
Many back-end announcements:
Microsoft AppFabric, based on the earlier .NET Application Server and the caching technology (formerly codenamed "Velocity").
Microsoft SQL Server Modeling Services (SSModS) released (formerly codenamed "Oslo")
BizTalk Server 2009 R2 announced with new features like an improved mapper for early 2010 release
Many front-end announcements:
Release of first public betas for Microsoft Office 2010, Microsoft Silverlight 4
Early revelations about Microsoft Internet Explorer 9 and its objective of better Acid3 performance and HTML5/CSS3 compliance.
A special "PDC 2009" Acer 1420p Multi-touch Tablet PC was given out to all attendees (the BIOS referencing MSFT in the 'about' information.)
 October 28–29, 2010 - Microsoft Campus in Redmond, Washington
 Announced new Platform Features for Cloud Computing
 VmRoles announced to port existing on-premises Applications to the Cloud
 Microsoft "Dallas" renamed to Windows Azure Marketplace DataMarket
 Windows Azure Marketplace Applications announced
 An unlocked Windows Phone 7 smartphone was given out to all attendees
 Microsoft limited the number of attendees to 1,000
 Many public viewing events all over the globe (e.g. Tokyo, London, Cologne, Vienna)

Other Microsoft developer conferences
Dev Connections
Microsoft TechEd
Mix
PASS
SQLBits
VSLive!

See also 
 Windows Hardware Engineering Conference (WinHEC)

References

External links
Professional Developers Conference
Video Archive Of Keynotes
Build Windows

Microsoft conferences